Contaminants of emerging concern (CECs) is a term used by water quality professionals to describe pollutants that have been detected in environmental monitoring samples, that may cause ecological or human health impacts, and typically are not regulated under current environmental laws. Sources of these pollutants include agriculture, urban runoff and ordinary household products (such as soaps and disinfectants) and pharmaceuticals that are disposed to sewage treatment plants and subsequently discharged to surface waters.

Examples of emerging contaminants are 1,4-Dioxane, food additives, pharmaceuticals, and natural & synthetic hormones. CECs have the ability to enter the water cycle after being discharged as waste through the process of runoff making its way into rivers, directly through effluent discharge, or by the process of seepage and infiltration into the water table, eventually entering the public water supply system. Emerging contaminants are known to cause endocrine disrupting activity and other toxic mechanisms, some are recognized as known carcinogens by the United States Environmental Protection Agency (EPA).

General problem 
For a compound to be recognized as an emerging contaminant it has to meet at least two requirements:
 Adverse human health effects have been associated with a compound.
 There is an established relationship between the positive and negative effect(s) of the compound.
Emerging contaminants are those which have not previously been detected through water quality analysis, or have been found in small concentrations with uncertainty as to their effects. The risk they pose to human or environmental health is not fully understood.

Contaminant classes 
Contaminants of emerging concern (CECs) can be broadly classed into several categories of chemicals such as pharmaceuticals and personal care products, cyanotoxins, nanoparticles, and flame retardants, among others. However, these classifications are constantly changing as new contaminants (or effects) are discovered and emerging contaminants from past years become less of a priority. These contaminants can generally be categorized as truly "new" contaminants that have only recently been discovered and researched, contaminants that were known about but their environmental effects were not fully understood, or "old" contaminants that have new information arising regarding their risks.

Pharmaceuticals 
Pharmaceuticals are gaining more attention as CECs because of their continual introduction into the environment and their general lack of regulation. These compounds are often present at low concentrations in water bodies and little is currently known about their environmental and health effects from chronic exposure; pharmaceuticals are only now becoming a focus in toxicology due to improved analytical techniques that allow very low concentrations to be detected. There are several sources of pharmaceuticals in the environment, including most prominently effluent from sewage treatment plants, aquaculture and agricultural runoff.

Cyanotoxins 
The growth of cyanobacterial blooms has been increasing due to the eutrophication (or increase in nutrient levels) of surface waters around the world. The increase in nutrients such as nitrogen and phosphorus has been linked to fertilizer runoff from agricultural fields and the use of products such as detergents in urban spaces. These blooms can release toxins that can decrease water quality and are a risk to human and wildlife health. Additionally, there is a lack of regulations regarding the maximum contaminant levels (MCL) allowed in drinking water sources. Cyanotoxins can have both acute and chronic toxic effects, and there are often many consequences for the health of the environment where these occur as well.

Industrial chemicals 
Industrial chemicals from various industries are known to produce harmful chemicals that are known to cause harm to human health and the environment. Common industrial chemicals like 1,4-Dioxanes, Perfluorooctane sulfonate (PFOS) and Perfluorooctanoic acid (PFOA) are commonly found in various water sources.

Adverse human health effects 
Due to the large differences in transportability of compounds, there is a great level of variance contaminant to contaminant between the location of contamination and the place of occurring hazards. An example of the a contaminant which can have detected hazards at the point of origin is the effect of municipal solid waste on the environment through seepage and particulate pollution. On the other hand, the effects of water-soluble contaminants may be obscured a long time as they are washed far away from the contamination site and only slowly accumulate in oceans and groundwater to harmful concentrations.

Relation between compound and effects 
There is an overlap of many anthropogenically sourced chemicals that humans are exposed to regularly. This makes it difficult to attribute negative health causality to a specific, isolated compound. EPA manages a Contaminant Candidate List to review substances that may need to be controlled in public water systems. EPA has also listed twelve contaminants of emerging concern at federal facilities, with ranging origins, health effects, and means of exposure. The twelve listed contaminants are as follows: Trichloropropane (TCP), Dioxane, Trinitrotoluene (TNT), Dinitrotoluene, Hexahydro-trinitro-triazane (RDX), N-nitroso-dimethylamine (NDMA), Perchlorate,  Polybrominated biphenyls (PBBs), Tungsten, Polybrominated diphenyl ethers (PBDEs) and Nanomaterials.

Selected compounds listed as emerging contaminants  
The NORMAN network enhances the exchange of information on emerging environmental substances. A Suspect List Exchange (SLE) has been created to allow sharing of the many potential contaminants of emerging concern. The list contains more than 100,000 chemicals.

Table 1 is a summary of emerging contaminants currently listed on one EPA website and a review article. Detailed use and health risk of commonly identified CECs are listed in the table below.

Examples from the past 
 In the 19th and early 20th centuries asbestos was used in many products and in building construction, and was not considered a threat to human health or the environment. Deaths and lung problems caused by asbestos were first documented in the early 20th century. The first regulations of the asbestos industry were published in the UK in the 1930s. Regulation of asbestos in the US did not occur until the 1980s.
 In the 1970s there was a serious issue with the water treatment infrastructure of some US states, notably in Southern California with water sourced from the Sacramento–San Joaquin River Delta. Water was being disinfected for domestic use through chlorine treatment, which was effective for killing microbial contaminants and bacteria, but in some cases, it reacted with runoff chemicals and organic matter to form trihalomethanes (THMs). Research done in the subsequent years began to suggest the carcinogenic and harmful nature of this category of compounds. EPA issued its first standard for THMs, applicable to public water systems, in 1979, and more stringent standards in 1998 and 2006.
Rapid industry changes also make the treatment and regulation of CECs particularly challenging. For instance, the replaced substance (GenX), for the recently regulated perfluorooctanoic acid (PFOA), a PFAS, had a more detrimental environmental impact, resulting in the subsequently banning of GenX as well. Hence, there is a pressing need for the treatment and management of CECs to keep up with global trends.

Risks and regulations 

Emerging contaminants are most often addressed as an issue concerning water quality. The release of harmful compounds into the environment which find their way into municipal food, water, and homes have a negative externality on social welfare. These contaminants have the capability to travel far from the point-source of their pollution into the environment and accumulate over time to become harmful because they have been left unregulated by federal agencies. These harmful compounds cause damage to environmental and human health, and they are difficult to trace therefore it is challenging to establish who should foot the bill for the damage done by ECs. Because these contaminants were not detected or regulated in the past, existing treatment plants are ill-equipped to remove them from domestic water. There are sites with waste that would take hundreds of years to clean up and prevent further seepage and contamination into the water table and surrounding biosphere. In the United States, the environmental regulatory agencies on the federal level are primarily responsible for determining standards and statutes which guide policy and control in the state to prevent citizens and the environment from being exposed to harmful compounds. Emerging contaminants are examples of instances in which regulation did not do what it was supposed to, and communities have been left vulnerable to adverse health effects. Many states have assessed what can be done about emerging contaminants and currently view it as a serious issue, but only eight states have specific risk management programs addressing emerging contaminants.

Solutions 
These are tactics and methods that aim to remediate the effects of certain, or all, CECs by preventing movement throughout the environment, or limiting their concentrations in certain environmental systems. It is particularly important to ensure that water treatment approaches do not simply move contaminants from effluent to sludge given the potential for sludge to be spread to land providing an alternative route to entering the environment.

Advanced treatment plant technology 
For some emerging contaminants, several advanced technologies—sonolysis, photocatalysis, Fenton-based oxidation and ozonation—have treated pollutants in laboratory experiments. Another technology is "enhanced coagulation" in which the treatment entity would work to optimize filtration by removing precursors to contamination through treatment. In the case of THMs, this meant lowering the pH, increasing the feed rate of coagulants, and encouraging domestic systems to operate with activated carbon filters and apparatuses that can perform reverse osmosis. Although these methods are effective, they are costly, and there have been many instances of treatment plants being resistant to pay for the removal of pollution, especially if it wasn't created in the water treatment process as many EC's occur from runoff, past pollution sources, and personal care products. It is also difficult to incentivize states to have their own policies surrounding contamination because it can be burdensome for states to pay for screening and prevention processes. There is also an element of environmental injustice, in that lower income communities with less purchasing and political power cannot buy their own system for filtration, and are regularly exposed to harmful compounds in drinking water and food. However recent treads for Light-based systems shows great potential for such applications. With the decrease in cost of UV-LED systems and growing prevalence of solar powered systems, it shows great potential to remove CECs while keeping cost low.

Metal–organic framework-based nano-adsorbent remediation 
Researchers have suggested that metal–organic frameworks (MOFs) and MOF-based nano-adsorbents (MOF-NAs) could be used in the removal of certain CECs like pharmaceuticals and personal care products, especially in wastewater treatment. Widespread use of MOF-based nano-adsorbents has yet to be implemented due to complications created by the vast physicochemical properties that CECs contain. The removal of CECs largely depends on the structure and porosity of the MOF-NAs and the physicochemical compatibility of both the CECs and the MOF-NAs. If a CEC is not compatible with the MOF-NA, then particular functional groups can be chemically added to increase compatibility between the two molecules. The addition of functional groups causes the reactions to rely on other chemical processes and mechanisms, such as hydrogen bonding, acid-base reactions, and complex electrostatic forces. MOF-based nano-adsorbent remediation heavily relies on water-qualities, such as pH, in order for the reaction to be executed efficiently. MOF-NA remediation can also be used to efficiently remove other heavy metals and organic compounds in wastewater treatment.

Membrane bioreactors 
Another method of possible remediation for CECs is through the use of membrane bioreactors (MBRs) that act through mechanisms of sorption and biodegradation. Membrane bioreactors have shown results on being able to filter out certain solutes and chemicals from wastewater through methods of microfiltration, but due to the extremely small size of CECs, MBRs must rely on other mechanisms in order to ensure the removal of CECs. One mechanism that MBRs use to remove CECs from wastewater is sorption. Sorption of the CECs to sludge deposits in the MBR's system can allow the deposits to sit and be bombarded with water, causing the eventual biodegradation of CECs in the membrane. Sorption of a particular CEC can be even more efficient in the system if the CEC is hydrophobic, causing it to move from the wastewater to the sludge deposits more quickly.

References

Pollutants
Water pollution in the United States